UK driving licences may be endorsed by order of the courts if the driver has been convicted of an offence concerned with driving or operating a vehicle. An endorsement may also be accompanied by a number of points which can remain on the licence for up to 11 years.  If the total of points on a licence equals or exceeds 12, the courts may decide to ban a driver for a period of time. 
The list below, does not apply to Northern Ireland, see website below. However, 'Mutual recognition' (MR) codes have been included as these are added to the driving record if one is disqualified whilst driving in Northern Ireland, the Isle of Man or the Republic of Ireland. The disqualification period will also be valid in GB and will stay on the record for 4 years from the date of conviction.

References

Licence endorsements
Statutory law
driving licence endorsements